This is a list of notable South Korean idol groups that debuted in the 2020s. Only groups that have an article in Wikipedia are listed here.

2020

 Aespa
 Astro – Moonbin & Sanha
 B.O.Y
 BAE173
 Blackswan
 Botopass
 BtoB 4U
 Cignature
 Cravity
 DKB
 Drippin
 E'Last
 Enhypen
 Even of Day
 Ghost9
 H&D
 Lunarsolar
 MCND
 P1Harmony
 Redsquare
 Red Velvet – Irene & Seulgi
 Refund Sisters
 Secret Number
 SSAK3
 STAYC
 TO1
 Treasure
 UNVS
 Weeekly
 WEi
 Woo!ah!

2021

 Billlie
 Blitzers
 BugAboo
 Ciipher
 Epex
 Hot Issue
 Ichillin'
 Ive
 Just B
 Kingdom
 Lightsum
 Luminous
 Mirae
 NTX
 Omega X
 Pixy
 Purple Kiss
 TFN
 Tri.be
 Xdinary Heroes

2022

Acid Angel from Asia
Astro – Jinjin & Rocky
ATBO
Blank2y
Classy
CSR
Fifty Fifty
Got the Beat
H1-Key
ILY:1
Irris
Kep1er
Lapillus
Le Sserafim
Mimiirose
NewJeans
Nmixx
TAN
Tempest
TNX
Trendz
Viviz
WSG Wannabe
Younite

2023

 8Turn
 BabyMonster
 Mave:
 TripleS

See also
 List of South Korean idol groups (1990s)
 List of South Korean idol groups (2000s)
 List of South Korean idol groups (2010s)

 
Lists of South Korean bands
2020s in South Korean music